Martin "Martti" Aleksander Nieminen (3 November 1891 – 29 March 1941) was a Finnish wrestler who competed in the 1920 Summer Olympics. He was born in Salo and died in Helsinki.

In 1920 he won the bronze medal in the Greco-Roman heavyweight competition after winning the final of the bronze medal round against Alexander Weyand.

References

External links
 

1891 births
1941 deaths
People from Salo, Finland
Olympic wrestlers of Finland
Wrestlers at the 1920 Summer Olympics
Finnish male sport wrestlers
Olympic bronze medalists for Finland
Olympic medalists in wrestling
Medalists at the 1920 Summer Olympics
Sportspeople from Southwest Finland
19th-century Finnish people
20th-century Finnish people